Tladi Bokako (born 21 April 1993) is a South African cricketer. He was included in the Eastern Province cricket team squad for the 2015 Africa T20 Cup. In June 2018, he was named in the squad for the Cape Cobras team for the 2018–19 season.

In September 2018, he was named in South Western Districts' squad for the 2018 Africa T20 Cup. The following month, he was named in Durban Heat's squad for the first edition of the Mzansi Super League T20 tournament. In April 2021, he was named in Gauteng's squad, ahead of the 2021–22 cricket season in South Africa.

References

External links
 

1993 births
Living people
Cricketers from Port Elizabeth
South African cricketers
Eastern Province cricketers
Warriors cricketers
South Western Districts cricketers
Cape Cobras cricketers
Durban Heat cricketers
Western Province cricketers
Lions cricketers
Gauteng cricketers